Acosmeryx pseudomissa is a moth of the family Sphingidae. It was described by Rudolf Mell in 1922. It is known from Thailand, southern China and Vietnam.

The larvae feed on Actinidia species.

References

Acosmeryx
Moths described in 1922
Moths of Asia